Kwon Young-jin (born 10 December 1962) is a South Korean politician who currently serves as the mayor of Daegu.

Life
Kwon Young-jin was born on December 10, 1962 in Andong, North Gyeongsang Province.

In 2002, Kwon entered politics on the recommendation of the President of the Grand National Party Lee Hoi-chang. In 2004, he led the way "Tent headquarters movement" of the Grand National Party.

In 2007 presidential election, Kwon supported Lee Myung-bak. And he ran for the 2008 legislative election for Nowon District, Seoul and he won over the Woo Won-shik of the United Democratic Party. However, he lost to Woo Won-shik in the 2012 legislative election.

Kwon ran for mayor of Daegu in the 2014 local elections and won. And in 2018, he was re-elected despite his party (Liberty Korea Party)'s poor approval rating. He put up the city government's slogan is "Only Citizens' Happiness, Creating Daegu."

In 2021, Kwon gained international attention during the COVID-19 pandemic when he propagated a fraudulent COVID-19 vaccine proposal to South Korean news media. Mayor Kwon announced to reporters in May 2021 that his city, via a public-private partnership focused on unifying medical care throughout Daegu, was in talks with a foreign trading company to obtain 30 million doses of the Pfizer COVID-19 vaccine independently from the central government (headed by Moon Jae-in's opposition party). Following this media event, Kwon's office sent South Korea's Ministry of Health and Welfare import proposal drafts between the public-private partnership, Medi-City Daegu Council, and the foreign trading company. It raised concerns about the deal, citing "reliability issues" due to Pfizer only supplying its vaccines through central governments and international health organizations, not through unaffiliated intermediaries. Kwon has since apologized for giving credence to the fraudulent vaccine distribution scam.

References

External links
 Kwon Young-jin's Blog

1962 births
Living people
Liberty Korea Party politicians
People from North Gyeongsang Province
Provincial governors of South Korea